is a Japanese tennis player. He has won two ATP Tour singles titles and achieved a career-high ATP singles ranking of world No. 32 on 20 February 2023.
He is currently the No. 1 Japanese player.

Career

Junior career
As a junior, he compiled a 113–49 win–loss record in singles (and 63–45 in doubles), achieving a combined ranking of No.12 in the world in January 2012.

Junior Grand Slam singles results 
Australian Open: 3R (2013)
French Open: 2R (2012, 2013)
Wimbledon: 2R (2012, 2013)
US Open: SF (2012)

2014
Nishioka qualified for the US Open in his first Grand Slam qualifying appearance, but he was forced to retire in the first round match against Paolo Lorenzi because of illness. The next week, he claimed his first ATP Challenger Tour title in Shanghai by beating Somdev Devvarman in the final.

In September, Nishioka earned men's singles gold medal in the 2014 Asian Games at Incheon, where he upset top seed Lu Yen-hsun of Chinese Taipei in the final. He also became the first Japanese men's singles champion since Toshiro Sakai, who won the 1974 Asian Games in Tehran.

2015
Nishioka qualified for the Delray Beach Open in February. He beat Igor Sijsling in the first round to record his first ATP main-draw win. He followed that up with a straight-sets win over Marinko Matosevic to become the first teenage qualifier to reach the quarterfinals of the tournament since his countryman Kei Nishikori. He lost to Bernard Tomic in straight sets.

During the spring clay court season, Nishioka made his debut at the 2015 French Open, losing to fourth seed Tomáš Berdych in the first round. In the 2015 US Open, Nishioka advanced to the second round of a Major for the first time in his career, beating fellow qualifier Paul-Henri Mathieu in five sets. He was beaten by 30th seed Thomaz Bellucci in the next round. In November, he ended the 2015 season with his second challenger title in Toyota, beating Alexander Kudryavtsev in the final.

2016: Miami Open third round, Top 100
By winning the Asia-Pacific wildcard play-offs in Shenzhen, Nishioka earned a wildcard into the 2016 Australian Open. However, he fell in the first round to Pablo Cuevas. In February, he reached the quarterfinal of the Memphis Open as a qualifier, winning over Jared Donaldson and Illya Marchenko along the way. He lost to fourth seed Sam Querrey in straight sets. He then qualified for the Miami Open to make his ATP World Tour Masters 1000 main-draw debut, getting to the third round after beating fellow qualifier Jared Donaldson and 21st seed Feliciano López. He lost his chance to compete in the round of sixteen when he was beaten by 14th seed Dominic Thiem.

In June, Nishioka won through qualifying at 2016 Wimbledon for the first time, losing to Sergiy Stakhovsky in the first round of the main draw. The following week, he earned his third Challenger title in Winnetka without dropping a set, beating Frances Tiafoe in the final. He also moved into the top 100 of the ATP rankings for the first time. At the Atlanta Tennis Championships, he reached his first ATP tournament semi-final, after defeating Daniel Evans, fourth seed Alexandr Dolgopolov and Horacio Zeballos. He then lost to eventual champion Nick Kyrgios in three sets.

2017: Rising star, Indian Wells fourth round, knee injury
At the 2017 Australian Open, Nishioka earned his second win at a Grand Slam tournament when he defeated Alex Bolt. In the second round, he was ousted by Roberto Bautista Agut in straight sets. In February, he qualified for the Mexican Open by defeating Tobias Kamke and Ryan Harrison. He proceeded to the quarterfinals after wins against Jack Sock and Jordan Thompson. His victory against Sock was his first win over a top-20 opponent on the ATP Tour. He was then defeated by Rafael Nadal in straight sets.

In March, Nishioka built on his momentum by entering the main draw at 2017 Indian Wells as a lucky loser. In the first round of the main draw, he played a rematch of his qualifying loss against Elias Ymer, this time winning in straight sets. In the second and third rounds he defeated Ivo Karlovic and Tomas Berdych respectively. He was lauded for his comeback three-set victory against Berdych after being down 1–6, 2–5. He was ousted in the fourth round by world No. 3 Stan Wawrinka in a tight three-set match 3–6, 6–3, 7–6(7–4), that featured multiple breaks of serve and a tiebreak in the third set; Wawrinka went on to become runner-up in the Masters tournament.

Nishioka's promising start to the season was abruptly cut short when he ruptured the ACL of his left knee in a match against Jack Sock at the Miami Open. He underwent surgical reconstruction of the ACL on April 4, 2017.

2018: Return from injury, first ATP title
After rehabilitating his knee, Nishioka returned to the ATP tour in January 2018. He chose to use his protected ranking (no. 66) to receive direct entry into the 2018 Australian Open draw. In the first round of the 2018 Australian Open, his first major match since his injury, he defeated No. 28 seed Philipp Kohlschreiber in five sets. At the Shenzhen Open, he won the first ATP World Tour title in his career, defeating Pierre-Hugues Herbert in the final.

2019: Consistent Major results, Masters quarterfinal, first top-10 win
Nishioka defeated American Tennys Sandgren in the first round of the 2019 Australian Open in a tight match. He fell to Karen Khachanov in the second round. It marked the third consecutive year Nishioka reached the second round in Melbourne, where he has had his most consistent success in the Grand Slam events.

In the 2019 French Open, Nishioka defeated American Mackenzie McDonald in the first round. He fell to Juan Martín del Potro in a nearly four-hour-long five-set match in the second round, which included a comeback tiebreak to push the match to a fifth set. Nishioka's trademark defensive game was not ultimately enough to prevail over the powerful Argentine. Del Potro crossed the net and bowed to Nishioka in respect at the end of the epic match.

At the 2019 Western & Southern Open, Nishioka had his first win against a top-ten player, defeating Kei Nishikori, whom Nishioka described as his hero, in the second round. Nishioka advanced to the quarter-finals of the tournament but had to withdraw due to illness.

2020-21: Australian Open third round, Second final, Top 50 debut
At the 2020 Australian Open, Nishioka reached the third round of a Grand Slam for the first time in his career defeating 30th seed Dan Evans.

Nishioka reached his second ATP final in Delray Beach, where he lost to the beast Reilly Opelka in three sets. As a result, he reached the top 50 at world No. 48 on 24 February 2020.

At the 2020 US Open, Nishioka lost in the first round to former champion Andy Murray in a come-from-behind victory for the Scotsman in five sets.

Nishioka reached the quarterfinals in Lyon, beating Ugo Humbert and 5th seed Gaël Monfils, both in 3 sets. He would end up losing to Stefanos Tsitsipas in straight sets.

2022: First ATP 500 final, Japanese No. 1, Second title, Top 40, Asian No. 1
Nishioka started his 2022 season at the Adelaide International 1. He lost in the first round to eighth seed Kwon Soon-woo. Getting past qualifying at the Adelaide International 2, he was defeated in the first round by lucky loser Thiago Monteiro. At the Australian Open, he lost in the first round to qualifier, Radu Albot, in four sets.

After the Australian Open, Nishioka played at the Columbus Challenger. Seeded third, he won his 11th ATP challenger title by beating Dominic Stricker in the final. Seeded third at the Cleveland Open, he reached the final; however, he was defeated by Dominic Stricker. At the first edition of the Dallas Open, he was eliminated in the second round by fifth seed Adrian Mannarino. In Delray Beach, he was beaten in the first round by Oscar Otte. Making it past qualifying at the Abierto Mexicano Telcel in Acapulco, he upset seventh seed, world No. 16, and 2020 finalist, Taylor Fritz, in the second round. He lost in the quarterfinals to top seed and world No. 2, Daniil Medvedev. At the Indian Wells Masters, he fell in the final round of qualifying to Mikhail Kukushkin. Getting past qualifying at the Miami Open, he defeated 24th seed and world No. 27, Dan Evans, in the second round to reach the third round as a qualifier for only the second time in his career at this Masters event. He lost in the third round to Lloyd Harris.

Nishioka started his clay-court season at the BMW Open in Munich. Getting past qualifying, he lost in the first round to Emil Ruusuvuori. In Madrid, he was defeated in the first round of qualifying by Lorenzo Musetti. At the Italian Open, he lost in the first round of qualifying to Francisco Cerúndolo. At the Lyon Open, he was eliminated in the first round of qualifying by Ugo Blanchet. At the French Open, he lost in the first round to world No. 1, 20-time major champion, and two-time French Open champion, Novak Djokovic.
At Wimbledon, Nishioka lost in the first round to Emil Ruusuvuori in four sets.

Ranked No. 96 at the 2022 Citi Open he again reached the quarterfinals at this level, defeating Jenson Brooksby as well as Atlanta champion and 11th seed Alex De Minaur and 7th seed Karen Khachanov in straight sets. He defeated 16th seed Dan Evans in three tough sets to reach the semi-finals of an ATP 500 event for the first time in his career. He went one step further to reach the biggest final of his career, defeating world No. 8 and top seed Andrey Rublev in straight sets, his third top-10 win in his career. He lost in the final to Nick Kyrgios. As a result, he moved up more than 40 positions back into the top 60 and became the No. 1 Japanese player.

At the 2022 Korea Open he defeated fifth seed Dan Evans in the first round for the sixth time overall and the third time this season. Next he defeated compatriot Taro Daniel and top seed and world No. 2 Casper Ruud to reach the semifinals for only his second Top 5 win of his career. He defeated lucky loser Aleksandar Kovacevic to reach the final. He won his second title defeating fourth seed Denis Shapovalov in the final in straight sets. As a result, he reached a new career-high of No. 41 on 3 October 2022. He became the first player from his nation to win a tour-level title since Kei Nishikori won Brisbane in 2019. At his home tournament the 2022 Rakuten Japan Open Tennis Championships he lost in the first round to Miomir Kecmanovic.

At the 2022 Rolex Paris Masters he lost to World No. 1 Carlos Alcaraz in straight sets. Despite the loss he reached a new career-high ranking of No. 36 on 7 November 2022 becoming the No. 1 Asian player, one position ahead of Alexander Bublik.

2023: Australian Open fourth round

Performance timelines

Singles 
Current through the 2023 Australian Open.

ATP career finals

Singles: 4 (2 titles, 2 runner-ups)

ATP Challenger and Futures finals

Singles: 17 (11 titles, 6 runners-up)

Doubles: 1 (1 runner-up)

Wins over top 10 players

References

External links

1995 births
Living people
Japanese male tennis players
People from Tsu, Mie
Sportspeople from Mie Prefecture
Asian Games medalists in tennis
Tennis players at the 2014 Asian Games
Asian Games gold medalists for Japan
Asian Games bronze medalists for Japan
Medalists at the 2014 Asian Games
Olympic tennis players of Japan
Tennis players at the 2020 Summer Olympics
20th-century Japanese people
21st-century Japanese people